Colony is an American science fiction drama television series created by Carlton Cuse and Ryan J. Condal, starring Josh Holloway and Sarah Wayne Callies. A ten-episode first season premiered with an online preview release of the first episode on USA Network's website on December 15, 2015, following the launch of a game-like website to promote the show. 

The series had its broadcast premiere on USA Network on January 14, 2016. In April 2017, Colony was renewed for a third season which premiered on May 2, 2018. On July 21, 2018, USA Network announced they had cancelled the series after three seasons.

Setting 
In a dystopian near-future Los Angeles, residents live under a regime of military occupation by an organization known as the Transitional Authority. The Authority serves an extraterrestrial group referred to as the "Hosts", about whom little is known until later in the series (an alien robotic race finds itself hunted, who came to Earth to use humans as allies and labor in their own battle). The symbol of the collaborating forces features stylized birds of prey, or raptors, which gives rise to their nickname, the "Raps". The Authority enforces Host policy via militarized police called Homeland Security and nicknamed the "Redhats" for the red helmet cover of their otherwise black tactical attire.

The Hosts took control on a day known simply as the "Arrival". That day began with massive worldwide communication interference and jamming, which came after a weeklong hunt for relevant key figures around the world. Late that day, massive rectangular blocks descended from the sky, linking together to build walls dividing the city. One of these walls, 20 to 30 stories tall, many meters thick and many miles in length, surrounds the central part of Los Angeles, where the series is set. Other similar walls have been constructed around neighbouring urban areas, called "blocs", with the whole referred to as a "colony". Traffic passes through the walls at heavily secured checkpoints, called "gateways", which allow the Authority to strictly control the movement of people and the distribution of consumables, such as food and fuel, which are rationed. The geographical extent of the alien invasion is unclear, but later scenes in the series shows Authority members from all over the world - hence making the invasion scale worldwide.

A privileged class of elites, drawn by the Hosts from the local population, are denigrated by some bloc residents as collaborators. The ruling forces maintain control through the separation of family members, shoot-on-sight curfews, forced disappearances, random checkpoints, frequent electronic identity checks, limitation of motor vehicle usage (most people walk or ride bicycles), pervasive visual propaganda, slave labor in a place called the "Factory" (later revealed to be located on the Earth's moon to mine radioactive materials), and massive continuous electronic surveillance with both hidden cameras as well as host-provided drone aircraft that launch from hangar bays inside the wall and capable of killing humans by extremely lethal high energy weaponry. Some medical problems, such as diabetes, have been "deemed unworthy for treatment" by the Hosts, to cull the population.

A resistance movement is referred to as both the "Resistance" and the "Insurgency". An informal barter-based black market has also sprung up, trading in surplus materials and home-produced goods.

Allusion to historical events 
In a May 21, 2015, interview with Collider, executive producer Carlton Cuse stated that the show was "conceived as a metaphor for France during the Nazi occupation". In a separate interview with Entertainment Weekly, co-creator Ryan Condal detailed that the original concept behind Colony was that they "were actually inspired by Nazi-occupied Paris during WWII, where people went on living their lives, having coffee in street-side cafes while Nazi officers marched along the roads".

Plot 
The series begins less than a year after the arrival of aliens who occupy Earth. It follows the Bowmans and their extended family in Los Angeles. Their son, Charlie, was on a school sports trip and was separated from them when alien walls sectioned off part of the city. The father, Will Bowman, is a former FBI agent and retired Army Ranger who reluctantly joins the Redhats (humans collaborating with the aliens) and is tasked with tracking down members of the Resistance, after being threatened that he and his family would be sent to "the Factory" if he did not comply. Unbeknownst to Will, his wife, Katie, is an operative in the Resistance. She later reveals this, and they begin to trade information. Their son, Bram, discovers a way under the wall, and later joins a rival resistance group.

Cast and characters

Main 
 Josh Holloway as Will Bowman: A former U.S. Army Ranger and FBI special agent initially working under the alias Billy "Sully" Sullivan as a truck driver and mechanic. To protect his family from being sent to the Factory, and to find his missing son Charlie, Will starts working for the Redhats hunting down Resistance members.
 Sarah Wayne Callies as Katie Bowman: Will's wife and a secret Resistance operative. She owns and operates "The Yonk", a New Orleans-themed bar.
 Peter Jacobson as Alan Snyder: The Proxy Governor of the Los Angeles Bloc and an unrepentant Collaborator. Snyder claims to be a former Stanford University provost but is later revealed to have been the corrupt purchasing manager of a small community college. Snyder is removed as Proxy and made warden of a labor camp outside the bloc.
 Amanda Righetti as Madeline "Maddie" Kenner (seasons 1–2): Katie's younger sister
 Tory Kittles as Eric Broussard: A former U.S. Marine Corps Force Recon officer, CIA paramilitary operator and private military contractor. Now a Resistance operative, he infiltrates the Redhats and is Katie's main Resistance contact.
 Alex Neustaedter as Bram Bowman: Will and Katie's teenaged son
 Isabella Crovetti as Grace Kathryn "Gracie" Bowman: Will and Katie's young daughter
 Jacob Buster as Charlie Bowman (guest season 1; season 2–3): Will and Katie's younger son, who was separated from the rest of his family a year before the start of the series, when the wall went up. He is found by Will at the beginning of season 2 and reunited with his family.

Recurring 
 Kim Rhodes as Rachel (season 1): A doctor and Resistance cell member
 Paul Guilfoyle as Alexander Quayle (season 1): A former CIA Berlin station chief and Defense Intelligence Agency officer turned Los Angeles Resistance leader
 Cooper J. Friedman as Hudson (seasons 1–2): Madeline's diabetic son
 Carl Weathers as Bolton "Beau" Miller (season 1): A retired San Francisco Police Department officer and Homeland Security officer and Will Bowman's partner
 Ally Walker as Helena Goldwyn: Chief of staff and later Governor-General of the Los Angeles Colony of which the Bloc is a part
 Kathy Baker as Phyllis (season 1): Will's boss at Homeland Security whom he suspects (and she implies) is a former CIA agent
 Kathleen Rose Perkins as Jennifer McMahon (seasons 1–2): A former online dating service database administrator turned Homeland Security agent, below Phyllis and above Will and Beau
 Gonzalo Menendez as Captain Lagarza (season 1): A Redhat officer
 Erin Way as Lindsey (seasons 1–2): The Proxy government-provided tutor for Gracie Bowman
 Kathryn Morris as Charlotte Burgess (season 1): A cultural director in the green zone who becomes Maddie's boss
 Adrian Pasdar as Nolan Burgess (seasons 1–2): Charlotte's husband and an important player in the politics of the occupational government
 Bethany Joy Lenz as Morgan (season 2): A software engineer and Los Angeles Resistance member
 Charlie Bewley as Eckhart (seasons 1–2): A Resistance cell member
 Victor Rasuk as BB (seasons 1–2): A Resistance cell member
 Carolyn Michelle Smith as Devon (season 2): Will's partner at the FBI before the Arrival
 Mac Brandt as Sgt. Jenkins (season 2): A labor camp guard
 Jessica Parker Kennedy as Maya (season 2): A prisoner at the labor camp who befriends Bram
 Max Arciniega as Edison (season 2): A prisoner at the labor camp and accomplice of Maya
 Christian Clemenson as Dan Bennett (season 2): The new head of Homeland Security
 Toby Huss as Bob Burke (season 2): A scheming former Internal Affairs detective who is assigned as Will Bowman's new partner at Homeland Security 
 William Russ as Hennessey (season 2): An ex-spy and friend of Broussard
 Laura Innes as Karen (season 2): The leader of a violent anti-collaboration group in Los Angeles
 Keiko Agena as Betsy (season 2): A co-worker of Will Bowman and Jennifer at Homeland Security
 Meta Golding as Noa (season 2): A member of a Resistance cell from outside the walls
 John Hoogenakker as Scott Garland (season 3): A former FBI agent turned Greyhat lieutenant who is charged with hunting the Resistance in the Pacific Northwest
 Peyton List as Amy Leonard (season 3): A doctor and Resistance dispatcher who works with Broussard but distrusts Will
 Graham McTavish as Andrew MacGregor (season 3): A former conspiracy theorist who now leads a Resistance cell based in the forest
 Waleed Zuaiter as Vincent (season 3): The second-in-command of MacGregor's Resistance cell
 Wayne Brady as Everett Kynes (season 3): Head of the autonomous Seattle colony
 Stephen Lobo as Roy Morrow (season 3): Everett Kynes' long time friend and colleague
 Nicki Micheaux as Michelle (season 3): Katie's superior at her job at the Seattle Refugee Assistance program
 E.J. Bonilla as Harris (season 3): An investigator and bodyguard for Everett Kynes
 David Paetkau as Adam Ford (season 3): An investigator and bodyguard for Everett Kynes
 Will Brittain as Dave O'Neill (season 3): A mysterious acquaintance of Harris and Ford
 Elise Gatien as Meadow (season 3): Bram's new girlfriend in the Seattle colony
 Chris William Martin as Roger (season 3): Everett Kynes' assistant
 Barclay Hope as Sal (season 3): Meadow's father and Bram's superior in the Citizens Safety Patrol

Notes

Episodes

Season 1 (2016)

Season 2 (2017)

Season 3 (2018)

Specials

Reception

Critical response
The show has received generally positive reviews. On Metacritic it holds a score of 69/100, based on 22 reviews, indicating "generally favorable reviews". On Rotten Tomatoes, it holds a score of 84%, based on 31 reviews. The critics' consensus reads: "Colony offers an engaging enough narrative, a few scares, and an overall good time, even if none of it is particularly original".

Stephen King praised the series, saying: "In a year of remarkable TV, Colony is really something special: smart, suspenseful, subversive... thought-provoking".

Awards and nominations

References

External links 
 
 
 

2010s American drama television series
2016 American television series debuts
2018 American television series endings
2010s American science fiction television series
Dystopian television series
English-language television shows
Television series about extraterrestrial life
Television series by Universal Content Productions
Television series created by Carlton Cuse
Television shows filmed in Vancouver
USA Network original programming
Television series by Legendary Television
Drones in fiction
Fiction about rebellions
Alien invasions in television
Mass surveillance in fiction
Unfinished creative works